Warren Block may refer to:

Warren Block (Westbrook, Maine), listed on the National Register of Historic Places in Cumberland County, Maine
Warren Block (Marlborough, Massachusetts), listed on the National Register of Historic Places in Middlesex County, Massachusetts